Andraca lawa is a moth of the family Endromidae. It is found in the Philippines (Palawan).

The wingspan is 39–48 mm for males and about 60 mm for females. The forewings are reddish-brown with narrow transversal lines and a small, point-like blackish distal dot, as well as yellow external spots and bluish suffusion. The hindwings are slightly lighter, with the postmedian deeply lunate in the anal area. Adults are on wing in March, July, August, October and November, probably in two or more generations per year.

References

Moths described in 2012
Andraca